Rachel de Solla was a British actress.

She was born in 1854  in Strand, London, and died in Hammersmith, London at age 66.

Selected filmography
 The Jewel Thieves Outwitted (1913)
 East Lynne (1913)
 Jane Shore (1915)
 The Grit of a Jew (1917)
 The Ticket-of-Leave Man (1918)
 The Shuttle of Life (1920)

References

External links

Date of birth unknown
1920 deaths
English stage actresses
English silent film actresses
20th-century English actresses
1854 births